Reema Rakesh Nath is a Bollywood film writer, director, and producer best known for scripting the golden jubilee film Saajan, (1991) it was the highest grossing film that year and other films Aarzoo and Hum Tumhare Hain Sanam. she also directed film Mohabbat (1997).

Personal life
She is the daughter of actors D. K. Sapru and Hemvati. Her brother Tej Sapru and sister Priti Sapru are both actors. Reema is married to Producer Rakesh Nath and their son is Bollywood actor Karan Nath.

Filmography
As writer
Sailaab - Screenplay
Saajan - Story, Screenplay and Dialogue
Dil Tera Aashiq - Story
Jai Devaa - Story, Screenplay and Dialogues
Yaraana (1995) - Story, Screenplay and Dialogue
Aarzoo - Writer
Hum Tumhare Hain Sanam - Dialogue

As Producer
Yaraana

As Director
Mohabbat

References

External links

Living people
Indian women screenwriters
Indian women film directors
Hindi-language film directors
Indian women film producers
Hindi film producers
Hindi screenwriters
Year of birth missing (living people)